Thomas A. Edison Junior-Senior High School is a seven-year (6-12) public junior and senior high school of the Lake Station Community School Corporation in Lake Station, Indiana. The school serves most of Lake Station.

Demographics
The demographic breakdown of the 622 students enrolled in the 2014-2015 school district was:
Male - 52.3%
Female - 47.7%
Native American/Alaskan - 0.5%
Asian/Pacific islander - 0.3%
Black - 5.3%
Hispanic - 38.1%
White - 52.7%
Multiracial - 3.1%

71.2% of the students were eligible for free or reduced lunch.

Athletics
Edison is home to the "Fighting Eagles".  The following high school sports are offered at Edison:

Baseball (boys)
Basketball (girls and boys)
Cheerleading (girls)
Cross country (co-ed)
Football (boys)
Golf (boys)
Softball (girls)
Tennis (girls and boys)
Track (girls and boys)
Volleyball (girls)
Wrestling (boys)

See also
 List of high schools in Indiana

References

External links 
Thomas A. Edison Junior-Senior High School Official Site
Lake Station Community School Corporation website

Public high schools in Indiana
Schools in Lake County, Indiana
Public middle schools in Indiana
Educational institutions established in 1932
1932 establishments in Indiana